Fernando Hernández Izquierdo (20 July 1924 – 27 February 1995) was a Mexican equestrian. He competed at the 1968 Summer Olympics, the 1972 Summer Olympics and the 1976 Summer Olympics.

References

External links
 

1924 births
1995 deaths
Mexican male equestrians
Olympic equestrians of Mexico
Equestrians at the 1968 Summer Olympics
Equestrians at the 1972 Summer Olympics
Equestrians at the 1976 Summer Olympics
Pan American Games medalists in equestrian
Pan American Games silver medalists for Mexico
Equestrians at the 1975 Pan American Games
People from Toluca
Medalists at the 1975 Pan American Games